Edith Eluma  (born 27 September 1958) is a Nigerian footballer who played as a defender for the Nigeria women's national football team. She was part of the team at the inaugural 1991 FIFA Women's World Cup. At the club level, she played for Princess Jegede in Nigeria.

References

External links
 

1958 births
Living people
Nigerian women's footballers
Nigeria women's international footballers
Place of birth missing (living people)
1991 FIFA Women's World Cup players
Women's association football defenders